Laevilitorina macphersonae is a species of sea snail, a marine gastropod mollusk in the family Littorinidae, the winkles or periwinkles.

This species has become a synonym of Macquariella macphersonae Dell, 1964

References

Littorinidae
Gastropods described in 1964